Ewen Colin Cameron (born 12 January 1930) is a retired Australian politician. Born in Melbourne, he had been a farmer and member of Euroa Shire Council before entering federal politics. In 1977, he was elected to the Australian House of Representatives as the Liberal member for Indi, defeating Mac Holten, a member of the Liberals' Coalition partner the Country Party. He held the seat until his retirement in 1993.

References

Liberal Party of Australia members of the Parliament of Australia
Members of the Australian House of Representatives for Indi
Members of the Australian House of Representatives
1930 births
Living people
20th-century Australian politicians